Commodore (Kommodori) is a rank of Finnish Navy equal to captain in English-speaking navies being above commander (Komentaja) and below Flotilla Admiral (Lippueamiraali), equal Army rank is colonel.

During peacetime only a graduate of Finnish National Defence University can achieve the rank of commodore, and even during wartime reserve officers may achieve the rank of commodore only under anomalous circumstances.

Other uses in Finland
In Finnish yacht clubs a chairman/CEO is usually called a Commodor, a tradition originating from England. While in some countries commodore is also a title held by a senior captain within a shipping company, it is not used by Finnish shipping companies.

Military ranks of Finland
Naval ranks